The Drosophila obscura species group belongs to the subgenus Sophophora and contains 6 subgroups: 
affinis, microlabis, obscura, pseudoobscura, subobscura, and sinobscura.

Species
affinis species subgroup
Drosophila affinis Sturtevant, 1916
Drosophila algonquin Sturtevant and Dobzhansky, 1936
Drosophila athabasca Sturtevant and Dobzhansky, 1936
Drosophila azteca Sturtevant and Dobzhansky, 1936
Drosophila dobzhanskii Patterson, 1943
Drosophila inexspectata Tsacas, 1988
Drosophila narragansett Sturtevant and Dobzhansky, 1936
Drosophila novitskii Sulerud and Miller, 1966
Drosophila seminole Sturtevant and Dobzhansky, 1936
Drosophila tolteca Patterson and Mainland, 1944
microlabis species subgroup
Drosophila kitumensis Tsacas in Tsacas et al., 1985
Drosophila microlabis Seguy, 1938
obscura species subgroup
Drosophila ambigua Pomini, 1940
Drosophila bifasciata Pomini, 1940
Drosophila cariouae Tsacas in Tsacas et al., 1985
Drosophila dianensis Gao and Watabe, 2003
Drosophila eniwae Takada, Beppu and Toda, 1979
Drosophila epiobscura Parshad and Duggal, 1966
Drosophila eskoi Lakovaara and Lankinen, 1974
Drosophila frolovae Wheeler, 1949
Drosophila imaii Moriwaki and Okada in Moriwaki et al., 1967
Drosophila krimbasi Tsacas in Tsacas et al., 1985
Drosophila limingi Gao and Watabe, 2003
Drosophila obscura Fallen, 1823
Drosophila solstitialis Chen, 1994
Drosophila subsilvestris Hardy & Kaneshiro, 1968
Drosophila tristis Fallen, 1823
Drosophila tsukubaensis Takamori and Okada, 1983
pseudoobscura species subgroup
Drosophila cuauhtemoci Felix and Dobzhansky in Felix et al., 1976
Drosophila lowei Heed, Crumpacker and Ehrman, 1968
Drosophila maya Heed and O'Grady, 2000
Drosophila miranda Dobzhansky, 1935
Drosophila persimilis Dobzhansky and Epling, 1944
Drosophila pseudoobscura Frolova in Frolova and Astaurov, 1929
sinobscura species subgroup
Drosophila hubeiensis Sperlich and Watabe in Watabe and Sperlich, 1997
Drosophila luguensis Gao and Toda, 2003
Drosophila sinobscura Watabe in Watabe et al., 1996
subobscura species subgroup
Drosophila guanche Monclus, 1976
Drosophila madeirensis Monclus, 1984
Drosophila subobscura Collin in Gordon, 1936
Unplaced
Drosophila alpina Burla, 1948
Drosophila helvetica Burla, 1948
Drosophila hypercephala Gao and Toda, 2009
Drosophila hideakii Gao and Toda, 2009
Drosophila quadrangula Gao and Toda, 2009

References 

obscura species group
Insect species groups